Rob Heaps is a British actor, known for co-starring as Ezra Bloom in the Bravo television series Imposters. He grew up in York, England. He went to drama school in St. Petersburg, Russia.

Filmography

References

External links

Living people
British male television actors
Place of birth missing (living people)
Year of birth missing (living people)